Jeremiah Colburn (12 January 1815 – 30 December 1891) was a Boston numismatist. He also collected various other things.

Biography
He lived his whole life in Boston.  He made his living first (1830) as a clerk, then as a merchant (until 1852), and eventually was appointed by President Franklin Pierce as an appraiser for the United States Customs Service (1852–1860).

He started his collecting activity with coins, and afterward turned his attention to shells, minerals, etc., and finally to books, autographs, manuscripts, portraits, and engravings relating to the United States, including continental money and the more recent issues of paper tokens. In 1840, he began a collection of bank notes. In 1857 he contributed articles to the Historical Magazine on U.S. coins and coinage, which were followed for several years by short articles on these subjects in Notes and Queries. He was one of the founders of the Boston Numismatic Society (1860), had been its curator, vice president, and president (1865–1891), and was one of the editors of the American Journal of Numismatics (1870–1891).

He founded the Prince Society (1858), was elected to the New England Historic Genealogical Society (1857), and was a founding member of the Boston Antiquarian Club (1879, later, 1881, the Bostonian Society).l

Family
His parents were Calvin Colburn and Caroline Sibyl Lakin.  His grandfather served in the Continental Army.  He married Eliza Ann Blackman in 1846.

Notes

References
 
  This article in turn cites:
 Biographies of Notable Americans, 1904
 Descendants of Edward Colburn∨Coburn, Sixth Generation, pp. 143–144.

1815 births
1891 deaths
People from Boston
American numismatists
People from Massachusetts
19th-century American businesspeople